Galantis is a Swedish electronic music production and songwriting duo consisting of Christian "Bloodshy" Karlsson from Miike Snow, and Linus Eklöw aka Style of Eye. They are best known for their biggest hit singles "Runaway (U & I)", "Peanut Butter Jelly" and "No Money".

The duo of Galantis initially met by chance at Karlsson's Robotberget studios in Stockholm, sometime in 2007. In 2009, Karlsson's band Miike Snow asked Eklöw, who produces and DJs as Style of Eye, to remix their song "Animal". After that, the two Swedes started hanging out in the studio together, playing each other songs and scraps of ideas.

Explaining what drew him to Eklöw, Karlsson says, "He's an amazing programmer and designer of soundscapes. It was artsy, in a way. He was different." The duo signed to Atlantic Records' dance imprint Big Beat Records in mid-2013. Recording in a studio in the Swedish archipelago in the Baltic Sea, the duo began to focus heavily on their artistic direction. They opt to combine the excitement and big energy of electronic music with meaningful songwriting.

The first composition they agreed upon was "Smile". After that, their direction became clear. "We felt the urge to fill the dance world up with songs and with songwriting. That created our sound," says Eklöw. "Smile" also marked the first instance of the "Seafox", a creature that is the brainchild of visual artist Mat Maitland. The "Seafox" is the Galantis mascot of sorts, appearing in all their videos, cover art and even their live show. In February, the duo released their second single "You". The track was subsequently played heavily at Winter Music Conference, becoming the 8th most Shazamed track at the festival.

Their debut self-titled EP Galantis was released on 1 April 2014. Galantis has had international success with their single "Runaway (U & I)", which debuted on 5 October 2014. The single is the lead single from their album Pharmacy, and reached the top 5 in Australia and the UK. It has been certified 2× Platinum in Australia, and Platinum in the UK, Norway and Sweden. 
Galantis released the single "Gold Dust" on 19 February 2015 through Stereogum. Galantis released their debut album Pharmacy on 8 June 2015. The album was available for pre-order on 20 April 2015. The 13-track album features the five singles "You" (from their first EP), "Runaway (U & I)", "Gold Dust", "Peanut Butter Jelly" and "In My Head". The duo uploaded each song to their YouTube channel with alternate artworks for each track.

Studio albums

Extended plays

Singles

As lead artist

As featured artist

Promotional singles

Guest appearances

Remixes

Music videos

Notes

References

Galantis